Dardo Federico Miloc (born 16 October 1990) is an Argentine professional footballer who plays as a defensive midfielder for Arsenal de Sarandí.

Career
Miloc had youth spells with Cambaceres and Gimnasia y Esgrima. It was with the latter that he made his professional debut with, it came on 5 July 2009 in an Argentine Primera División victory against Gimnasia y Esgrima (J). Ten further appearances followed in his first three seasons with Gimnasia, two of those came in the club's relegation season of 2010–11. In his twentieth match in Primera B Nacional, Miloc scored his first senior goal in a 3–0 win versus Sarmiento. Upon returning to the Primera División, Miloc played in thirty-eight games for Gimnasia. In January 2015, Miloc joined fellow top-flight team Sarmiento on loan.

He returned in June 2016 following thirty-five appearances. A year later, Miloc signed for Temperley on loan. He played eight times for them in 2016–17. On 13 August 2017, Miloc left Gimnasia permanently to join Atlético Tucumán. He made his Tucumán debut in the Copa Sudamericana against Independiente on 22 August. Miloc made a move to newly-promoted Primera División team Aldosivi on 19 June 2018. After eighteen games in 2018–19, Miloc spent the next two seasons with Patronato. He was sent off in back-to-back appearances across November and December 2019; versus Central Córdoba and Vélez Sarsfield respectively.

On 1 February 2021, Miloc headed abroad as he agreed terms with Super League Greece side Volos.

Career statistics
.

References

External links

1990 births
Living people
Footballers from La Plata
Argentine footballers
Association football midfielders
Argentine expatriate footballers
Expatriate footballers in Greece
Argentine expatriate sportspeople in Greece
Argentine Primera División players
Primera Nacional players
Club de Gimnasia y Esgrima La Plata footballers
Club Atlético Sarmiento footballers
Club Atlético Temperley footballers
Atlético Tucumán footballers
Aldosivi footballers
Club Atlético Patronato footballers
Volos N.F.C. players
Arsenal de Sarandí footballers
Argentine people of Serbian descent